The  were peasant-warriors that emerged in 15th-century Japan Muromachi period. They often used their relatively small plots of land for intensive and diversified forms of agriculture.

One of the primary causes for the rise in the number of smaller land holders was a decline in the custom of primogeniture. Towards the end of the Kamakura period, inheritance began to be split among a lord's sons, making each heir's holdings, and thus their power, smaller.

Over time, many of these smaller fiefs came to be dominated by the shugo, constables who were administrators appointed by the shogunate to oversee the provinces. Resentful and mistrustful of the interference of government officials, people under their control banded together into leagues called ikki. The uprisings that resulted, particularly when the shugo tried to seize control of entire provinces, were also called ikki; some of the largest and most famous took place in Wakasa Province in the 1350s, Yamashiro Province in 1485, and Kaga Province in 1487–1488. In the later two, independent confederacies, the Yamashiro and Kaga ikki, respectively, were established. In the late 15th century, jizamurai also formed ikki in Iga and Kōka, the military forces of which became known as ninja and gave name to the ninjutsu styles of Iga-ryū and Kōga-ryū.

See also
Ikkō-ikki
Gentry
Yeoman

References

Japanese historical terms
Government of feudal Japan
Titles